Henry Aldrich's Little Secret is a 1944 American comedy film directed by Hugh Bennett and written by Val Burton and Aleen Leslie. The film stars Jimmy Lydon, Charles Smith, John Litel, Olive Blakeney, Tina Thayer and Ann Doran. The film was released on June 10, 1944, by Paramount Pictures.

Plot

Henry Aldrich (Jimmy Lydon) and Basil 'Dizzy' Stevens (Charles Smith) run a baby sitting service, but quickly run into problems.  When a mother of a 10 month old baby exits town her husband is accused of a crime he didn't commit, sans baby, Aldrich and Stevens are left holding the bag, and the baby.

Cast 
Jimmy Lydon as Henry Aldrich
Charles Smith as Dizzy Stevens
John Litel as Mr. Aldrich
Olive Blakeney as Mrs. Aldrich
Tina Thayer as Jennifer Dale
Ann Doran as Helen Martin
John David Robb as Ricky Martin
Sarah Edwards as Mrs. Winnibegar
Harry C. Bradley as Mr. Tottle 
Lucille Ward as Mrs. O'Hara
Almira Sessions as Aunt Maude
Tom Fadden as Mr.Luther
George M. Carleton as Judge Hyde
Byron Foulger as Bill Collector
Fern Emmett as Miss Swithen
Dorothy Vaughan as Mrs. Olsen
Eddie Dunn as Policeman
Hal K. Dawson as Photographer
Noel Neill as Daisy
Lester Dorr as Joe

References

External links 
 

1944 films
American black-and-white films
Paramount Pictures films
American comedy films
1944 comedy films
The Aldrich Family films
1940s English-language films
Films directed by Hugh Bennett
1940s American films